The 1982 CART PPG Indy Car World Series season, the fourth in the CART era of U.S. open-wheel racing, consisted of 11 races,  beginning in Avondale, Arizona on March 28 and concluding at the same location on November 6.  The PPG Indy Car World Series Drivers' Champion was Rick Mears.  Rookie of the Year was Bobby Rahal.

Though it was not officially part of the CART calendar, most of the teams and drivers also competed at the USAC-sanctioned 66th Indianapolis 500. Gordon Johncock was victorious at Indy.

Jim Hickman was fatally injured in a practice crash for the Tony Bettenhausen 200 at Milwaukee, he was 39 years old.

Drivers and constructors
The following teams and drivers competed for the 1982 CART World Series.

Schedule 
New to the schedule was the 4 mile permanent road course named Road America. Returning to the schedule after a one year absence (1981 was a USAC race) was Pocono Raceway, the 2.5 mile superspeedway would host a 500 mile race in 1982.

 Oval/Speedway
 Dedicated road course
 Temporary street circuit

*The Stroh's 200 was scheduled for April 25, but postponed a week due to rain.  NBC planned to cover on April 25, but did not return for the May 1 running.

Season Summary

Race results 

Mario Andretti was credited with winning the pole position for the Norton Michigan 500, although he started 33rd due to a pre-race practice accident. Rick Mears started on the pole and both he and Andretti were credited with pole positions.

Final points standings

References
 
 
 
 http://media.indycar.com/pdf/2011/IICS_2011_Historical_Record_Book_INT6.pdf  (p. 198-199)

See also
 1981–82 USAC Championship Car season
 1982 Indianapolis 500
 1982–83 USAC Championship Car season

Champ Car seasons
CART